The GSIGR is a regiment within the Royal Moroccan Gendarmerie and consists of specially trained military units, educated and trained to carry out a range of special operations.

Organisation

GIGR is composed of the following units:

 1 Parachute squadron (BIP)
 1 SWAT team
  1 EOD team
 1 maritime assault
 1 Commando Group of the Guard
 1 Air Assault

References

Counterterrorist organizations
Special forces of Morocco